Kim Clijsters was the defending champion, but decided not to compete this year.

Petra Kvitová won the title, defeating Andrea Petkovic in the final 6–1, 6–3.

Seeds

Main draw

Finals

Top half

Bottom half

Qualifying

Seeds

Qualifiers

Lucky losers

Qualifying draw

First qualifier

Second qualifier

Third qualifier

Fourth qualifier

References

External links
 Main draw
 Qualifying draw

Brisbane International
Singles